Nuclear cap-binding protein complex is a RNA-binding protein which binds to the 5' cap of pre-mRNA. The cap and nuclear cap-binding protein have many functions in mRNA biogenesis including splicing, 3'-end formation by stabilizing the interaction of the 3'-end processing machinery, nuclear export and protection of the transcripts from nuclease degradation. When RNA is exported to the cytoplasm the nuclear cap-binding protein complex is replaced by cytoplasmic cap binding complex. The nuclear cap-binding complex is a functional heterodimer and composed of Cbc1/Cbc2 in yeast and CBC20/CBC80 in multicellular eukaryotes. Human nuclear cap-binding protein complex shows the large subunit, CBC80 consists of 757 amino acid residues. Its secondary structure contains approximately sixty percent of helical and one percent of beta sheet in the strand. The small subunit, CBC20 has 98 amino acid residues. Its secondary structure contains approximately twenty percent of helical and twenty-four percent of beta sheet in the strand. Human nuclear cap-binding protein complex plays important role in the maturation of pre-mRNA and in uracil-rich small nuclear RNA.

References

External links
 

RNA-binding proteins